The 2021 World Table Tennis Championships was held in Houston, United States from 23 to 29 November. It was the 56th edition of the championships and the first time the competition was held in the United States. Houston became the host by beating Agadir, Morocco in 2019.

The International Table Tennis Federation originally planned regional and continental stage events for the qualification purpose of the Championships finals in Houston. Due to the COVID-19 pandemic, no regional and continental stage events were held before the Championships finals. The ITTF decided the qualifications were mainly based on the world rankings published on 8 June (week 23) and 25 June (week 24). Six member associations (China, Japan, Chinese Taipei, Germany, South Korea and Hong Kong) were eligible to have five entries in singles events and four players in doubles events (with a maximum of two combined pairs with another member association).

Five individual events were contested. All events were played as a single-elimination tournament. The first round of singles events had 128 places and doubles events had 64 places. Singles matches were best of seven games and doubles matches were best of five. Reigning champions Ma Long, Liu Shiwen and Xu Xin did not defend their titles at the event as China opted to send younger players in preparation for the 2024 Summer Olympics in Paris, France.

Schedule
The 2021 World Championships was scheduled for seven days. Draws took place on 21 November.

Medal summary

Medal table

Medalists

References

External links
 2021 ITTF World Table Tennis Championships Finals. International Table Tennis Federation.
 2021 World Table Tennis Championships Finals. World Table Tennis.

 
World Table Tennis Championships
World Championships
World Table Tennis Championships
Table tennis competitions in the United States
World Table Tennis Championships
World Table Tennis Championships
2020s in Houston